The Saint Peter Port Lifeboat Station was established in Guernsey in 1803. Originally based at Saint Sampson, it relocated to Saint Peter Port in 1881.

History

Established in 1803 and based in Saint Sampson, Guernsey, a tidal harbour.

6 Silver medals awarded before the RNLI took over the station, the first in 1851 to John Mitchell for the rescue of 3 from the Cutter Adele. Five were awarded for the 1857 rescue of 6 crew from the barque Boadicea.

In 1861 the station was taken over by the Royal National Lifeboat Institution (RNLI) and a shed was built at St Sampson's.

Victor Hugo presented the Harbour Master Capt. Abraham Martin, as a ‘mark of esteem’ with his own design of lifejacket and belt in 1870.

1875 a new lifeboat arrived, the John Lockett. in 1878 the lifeboat was moved to Les Landes but problems in finding sufficient crew in the area resulted in the boat returned to St Sampson’s.

In 1881 the station relocated to Saint Peter Port Harbour castle emplacement with the Castle slipway being amended to suit lifeboat launches. 1896 saw the introduction of maroons to summon the crew.

In June 1940 the relief lifeboat Alfred and Clara Heath ON 672 was strafed by German aircraft and Harold Hobbs, son of the Coxswain Fred Hobbs, was killed. This lifeboat stayed in Guernsey during the occupation and was used by the Kriegsmarine (Nazi German navy).

Lifeboat house built on St Julians Emplacement in 1946.

In 1952 the Flying Christine, an ex seaplane tender was brought into service by St John Ambulance as an ambulance boat, to work closely with the RNLI.

RNLI Gold Medal and Norwegian Lifeboat Service Gold Medal awarded to Hubert Petit for rescue crew of 9 from Johann Collett in 1963. In 1977 maroons were replaced by ‘bleepers’, which were followed in 1983 with pagers.

In 1978 Coxswain John Petit was awarded a silver medal and the ‘Maud Smith’ award for the bravest act of lifesaving that year following the rescue from the oil rig Orion.

RNLI Gold Medal awarded to Coxwain Michael Scales for the rescue of 29 from Bonita in December 1981 as well as the ‘Maude Smith’ Award for the bravest act of lifesaving that year.

In 1992 Coxswain Peter Bisson received a silver medal for the rescue from the yacht Sena Siorra and the ‘Maude Smith’ Award for the bravest act of lifesaving that year.

From 2015, the Guernsey Joint Emergency Services Control Centre handles all 999 emergency calls including radio Mayday, Pan-pan and Sécurité messages.

2020 saw the RNLI's 1,500th call out from Guernsey, during which time 600 lives have been saved and 2,000 people taken to safety.

Operations
Search and rescue operations are conducted and co-ordinated using the Joint Emergency Services Control Centre (JESCC) with some or all of:

Lifeboat stations in Alderney, Jersey and France
Jersey Coastguard
Channel Islands Air Search spotter plane
Guernsey Fire and Rescue Service
Guernsey Ambulance and Rescue Service

UK Maritime and Her Majesty's Coastguard
French Maritime Authorities and Maritime Gendarmerie
Royal Navy
French Navy

Records and awards

RNLI Medals awarded:
 2 Gold medals
 14 Silver medals
 15 Bronze medals
Foreign bravery awards and commendations received from:
France, Norway, Greece, Liberia and Marshall Islands

Over 1,500 launches
Over 600 lives saved

Permanent Station Lifeboats

Alderney
In 1865 Gunner James Moore of the Royal Artillery in Alderney was awarded a silver medal for rescuing 17 people from the Carioca following which in 1869 a lifeboat station was established in Alderney, the first boat being the ‘Mary and Victoria’. The station closed in 1885 due to a shortage of crew.

In 1986 the Alderney station was re-opened with the 44 ft Waveney-class lifeboat ON 1045 Louis Marchesi of Round Table (44-019) based there from 1987. The current boat is the 46 ft Trent-class lifeboat ON 1199 Roy Barker I (14-04).

Between 1885 and 1986 the Saint Peter Port Lifeboat Station provided cover around Alderney.

Charity Status
The Saint Peter Port Lifeboat Station is a Guernsey registered charity. CH135.

Media

Pictures of four Guernsey lifeboats appeared on a set of postage stamps issued by Guernsey Post to commemorate the 150th anniversary of the RNLI in 1974 and a further six lifeboats appeared on a further set of stamps to commemorate the 175th anniversary of the RNLI in 1999.

The lifeboat has also appeared on phonecards issued by Cable & Wireless.

See also

 Royal National Lifeboat Institution

References

Bibliography 
 Blampied, Guy (1984), "Mayday! Mayday!: History of the Guernsey Lifeboat Station", Guernsey Press Co Ltd, 

Lifeboat stations in the United Kingdom
Organizations established in 1803